Gulftainer is a port operator with its corporate head office in the United Arab Emirates (UAE). It was established in 1976.

History
Gulftainer was formed in 1976 to manage and operate the Sharjah Container Terminal (SCT) on behalf of the Sharjah Port Authority. Ten years later a concession was awarded to Gulftainer to manage and operate Khorfakkan Container Terminal (KCT) in Khorfakkan Port and the container terminal in Hamriyah Port, Sharjah. In 2004, Gulftainer expanded beyond the UAE, initially as a consultant to the Kuwait Port Authority. Later the same year, it inaugurated the purpose-built Sharjah Inland Container Deport (SICD) near the Sharjah–Dubai border. 

Since then, it has carried out operations in South Asia, Pakistan, the Comoros Islands, Turkey, Iraq, Russia, Brazil, and Lebanon In June 2013, Gulftainer completed a major acquisition by securing the majority shareholding in Saudi Arabia's Gulf Stevedoring Contracting Company (GSCCO) almost doubling the company size. This acquisition made Gulftainer the largest port operator in the Middle East with regard to the number of terminals managed.

In June 2014, Gulftainer signed a 35–year concession with the Canaveral Port Authority in Florida, USA to operate and develop its container and multipurpose cargo terminal. The terminal, is Gulftainer's first venture in the United States. In September 2018, Gulftainer signed another contract in the US, a 50–year concession to operate the port of Wilmington, Delaware. The deal included a US$600 million investment commitment and upgrades to training facilities and terminal capabilities.

In August 2019 Gulf Stevedoring Contracting Company began operations at the King Fahad Industrial Port, Yanbu in Saudi Arabia, handling both container and breakbulk cargo.

Operations

In the UAE, Gulftainer operates three container terminals on behalf of the Sharjah Port Authority: 
Khorfakkan Container Terminal, strategically located on the east coast.
Sharjah Container Terminal, based in Port Khalid, which is a major import–export facility for industries located in Sharjah, in the UAE's industrial zones, and in the Northern Emirates, along with container facilities in Hamriyah Port. 
Hamriyah Port, located on the west coast of the UAE. A deepwater seaport located in the Hamriyah Free Zone.  Container operations are managed by Gulftainer.

Gulftainer operates the Iraq Container Terminal and the Iraq Project Terminal at the Umm Qasr Port. In Lebanon it operates facilities in the Port of Tripoli; whilst in the United States, Gulftainer commenced operations of all container and multi cargo facilities in Port Canaveral, Florida in January 2016. In September 2018, Gulftainer signed a 50—year agreement to manage operations at the Port of Wilmington, Delaware.

Gulftainer's non-port business activities include providing 3PL (Third party logistics) services within the UAE, Iraq, and Pakistan. Momentum Logistics, Gulftainer's logistics subsidiary manages the group's transportation and logistics operations throughout the Middle East and Asia.

The company owns and operates three logistics centres: 
 Saja'a Industrial Investment Park (SIIP), situated on the outskirts of Sharjah; 
 the Sharjah Inland Container Depot on the Dubai—Sharjah border with services ranging from customs clearance, warehousing and storage, to inland transportation, and;

In Saudi Arabia, Gulftainer operates container terminals within the Jubail Commercial Port and King Fahad Industrial Port.

Recognition
Khorfakkan Container Terminal has been recognized as the most productive port in Europe, the Middle East and Africa (EMEA) by the Journal of Commerce in 2013. It was also awarded a second place in the top 10 terminals in EMEA and third in the top 10 worldwide ports category. 
Gulftainer's KCT was the first port of call in the Middle East for CMA CGM's Marco Polo – at the time, the world's largest container ship – on its maiden voyage across the Persian Gulf.

In December 2016 and October 2017, Gulftainer was awarded the "Port Terminal Operator of the Year by Seatrade Middle East Awards." This was followed by the Gulftainer company receiving the "Technology Implementation of the Year" category at the Logistics Middle East Awards 2017.

In September 2017, Gulftainer CEO Flemming Dalgaard was named Industry CEO of the Year at the ITP CEO Awards, whilst in October 2017 Gulftainer won the Corporate Health and Wellness Initiative Award at the MEED Daman Health Awards.

In March 2018, Gulftainer won the Logistics Middle East Awards 2018 for The CSR Initiative of the year.

See also
Crescent Enterprises

References

External links
 

Port companies of the United Arab Emirates
Companies based in the Emirate of Sharjah
Business services companies established in 1976
Multinational companies
Emirati companies established in 1976